Josu Erkoreka (born 1963) is a Spanish politician affiliated with the Basque Nationalist Party.

From 28 November 2016 to 8 September 2020, he served as Minister of Public Governance and Self-Government and government spokesperson in the Second Urkullu Government led by Iñigo Urkullu. , he serves as First Vice Lehendakari and Minister of Security in the Third Urkullu Government.

References 

Living people
1963 births
Place of birth missing (living people)
Basque Nationalist Party politicians
Government ministers of the Basque Country (autonomous community)
Members of the 12th Basque Parliament
University of the Basque Country alumni
University of Deusto alumni
20th-century Spanish lawyers
People from Bermeo
Members of the 11th Basque Parliament
Members of the 10th Congress of Deputies (Spain)
Members of the 8th Congress of Deputies (Spain)
Members of the 9th Congress of Deputies (Spain)
Members of the 7th Congress of Deputies (Spain)
Academic staff of the University of Deusto